Abryna javanica is a species of beetle in the family Cerambycidae. It was described by Kriesche in 1924. It is known from Java.

References

Pteropliini
Beetles described in 1924